Egypt is the most populous country in North Africa and the fourth-most populous on the African continent, after Nigeria, Ethiopia and Democratic Republic of the Congo. About 95% of the country's 102 million people (July 2021) live along the banks of the Nile and in the Nile Delta, which fans out north of Cairo; and along the Suez Canal. These regions are among the world's most densely populated, containing an average of over 1,540 per km2, as compared to 96 persons per km2 for the country as a whole.

Small communities spread throughout the desert regions of Egypt are clustered around historic trade and transportation routes. The government has tried with mixed success to encourage migration to newly irrigated land reclaimed from the desert. However, the proportion of the population living in rural areas has continued to decrease as people move to the megacities in search of employment and a higher standard of living.

According to the Peterson Institute for International Economics and other proponents of demographic structural approach (cliodynamics), the basic problem Egypt has is an unemployment rate driven by a demographic youth bulge: with the number of new people entering the job force at about 4% a year, unemployment in Egypt is almost 10 times as high for college graduates as it is for people who have gone through elementary school, particularly educated urban youth, who comprised most of the people that were seen out in the streets during the Egyptian revolution of 2011. An estimated 51.2% of Egyptians are under the age of 25, with just 4.3% over the age of 65, making it one of the most youthful populations in the world.

History

Population
Egypt has a population of 92,000,000 (2016). According to the OECD/World Bank statistics population growth in Egypt from 1990 to 2008 was 23.7 million and 41%.

Age distribution
Data taken from Central Agency for Public Mobilization and Statistics.

	
Percentage distribution of population in censuses by age group

	
Population estimates by sex and age group (1 July 2010):

	
Population estimates by sex and age group (1 July 2012):

Population estimates by sex and age group (1 January 2013):

	
Population estimates by sex and age group (1 July 2013):

	
Population estimates by sex and age group (1 July 2014) in thousands:

	
Household population by age and sex (DHS 2014).

Total population in thousands: 114 428 (Males 56 926, Females 57 501)

Population estimates by sex and age group (1 January 2015):

Historical and present population distribution:

Egyptians abroad

Egyptians have a long history of mobility, primarily across the Arab world, but emigration became much more popular once it was recognised as a right in the 1971 Constitution. According to the International Organization for Migration, an estimated 2.7 million Egyptians live abroad and contribute actively to the development of their country through remittances (US$7.8 billion in 2009), circulation of human and social capital, as well as investment. Approximately 70% of Egyptian migrants live in Arab countries (923,600 in Saudi Arabia, 332,600 in Libya, 226,850 in Jordan, 190,550 in Kuwait with the rest elsewhere in the region) and the remaining 30% are living mostly North America (318,000 in the United States, 110,000 in Canada) and Europe (90,000 in Italy).

Urban and rural population 

Figures from CAPMAS:

Future population projections 
The Central Agency for Public Mobilization and Statistics (CAPMAS) had released high/medium/low population projections for 2011–2031 based on Final Results of 2006 Population Census. The 2020 high variant was 92.6 million, the medium – 91.0 million, the low – 90.0 million. The 2030 high variant is 104.4 million, the medium – 101.7 million, the low – 99.8 million. However the information could be misleading as the 2013 population figure of 84.6 million is higher than the projected high of 83 million. In fact, due to an unexpected rise in the fertility rate (from 3.0 to 3.5), the population already surpassed 91 million on 5 June 2016 while reaching 92 million on 30 November, average population age remaining stable despite a rising life expectancy.

Vital statistics
Vital statistics:

Current vital statistics

Fertility rate (Demographic Health Survey)
Fertility rate (TFR) (wanted fertility rate) and CBR (crude birth rate):

Life expectancy at birth 

Average life expectancy at age 0 of the total population.

Demographics by Governorate

Urban and Rural Population of Governorates
Data taken from CAPMAS:

Population density by governorate

As of 1 July 2014; data taken from CAPMAS: Information for population is in thousands, pop density – persons/km2 and area is in km2.

Ethnic groups

The CIA World Factbook lists Egyptians as 99.7%, and "other" as 0.3% (2006 census). "Other" refers to people who are not citizens of Egypt, who come to Egypt to work for international companies, diplomats, etc.

The vast majority of the population of Egypt consists of Egyptians including Copts, Egyptians make up 95% of the population. The vast majority of Egyptians are native speakers of  Egyptian Arabic.

Minorities in Egypt include the Copts who represent around 10% of the entire population and live all over the country, the Berber-speaking community of the Siwa Oasis (Siwis) and the Nubian people clustered along the Nile in the southernmost part of Egypt. There are also sizable minorities of Beja and Dom. There are also refugees mainly composed of Sudanese, and the over all refugees are estimated to be around 3–5 million, those from war-zone areas like Iraq, Ethiopia, Somalia, South Sudan, and Eritrea.

The country was also host to many different communities during the European occupation period, including Greeks, Italians, and also from war-torn areas; the Lebanese, Syro-Lebanese, and other minority groups like Jews, Armenians, Turks and Albanians, though most either left or were compelled to leave after political developments in the 1950s. The country still hosts some 90,000 refugees and asylum seekers, mostly Palestinians and Sudanese.

Other sources give more detailed statistics, including the Beja(ca. 1 million), the Nubians (ca. 300,000 in 1996), Dom (ca. 230,000 in 1996), Berbers (Siwis) (ca. 5,000).

Languages

Arabic is the official language of Egypt, with the vast majority of Egyptians speaking Egyptian Arabic. In The Upper Nile valley, Sa'idi Arabic is prevalent. The Coptic language is used in the Coptic church for the majority of prayers, hymns, masses, and meditations. 
English is widely understood.
Siwa language is used in ethnic Berber tribal areas in the western desert (Siwa), and Nubian language is widely used among the ethnic Nubians in the southern areas.

Religions

According to the CIA World Factbook, approximately 91% of the population is Muslim and 10% is Christian (9% Coptic Orthodox Church, 1% other Christian).

Muslim 90% (mostly Sunni)
Christianity 10%
Baháʼí: fewer than 2,000 individuals (< 0.003%)
Judaism: fewer than 200 individuals

Education

The literacy rate in modern Egyptian society is highly debated. Education is free through university and compulsory from ages six through 15, though enforcement may be lax. Rates for primary and secondary education have strengthened in recent years. The vast majority of children enter primary school though a significant number drop out. There are approx. 200,000 primary and secondary schools with some 10 million students, 13 major universities with more than 500,000 students, and 67 teacher colleges. Major universities include Cairo University (100,000 students), Ain Shams University, Alexandria University, the 1,000-year-old Al-Azhar University, one of the world's major centers of Islamic learning and the AUC (American University in Cairo), . The former first lady has created many project towards the advancement of Egyptian education and the efforts to force education to the remaining 7–9% of students who drop out illegally. Child labor is a contributing factor to these dropouts but it is considered a serious crime to work children under the legal age and charges are taken very seriously at this time.

CIA World Factbook demographic statistics
Demographic statistics according to the World Population Review in 2022.

One birth every 12 seconds	
One death every 52 seconds	
One net migrant every 13 minutes	
Net gain of one person every 17 seconds

The following demographic statistics are from the CIA World Factbook, unless otherwise indicated.

Population
107,770,524 (2022 est.)

Religions
Muslim (predominantly Sunni) 90%, Christian (majority Coptic Orthodox, other Christians include Armenian Apostolic, Catholic, Maronite, Orthodox, and Anglican) 10%

Age structure

0–14 years: 33.62% (male 18,112,550/female 16,889,155)
15–24 years: 18.01% (male 9,684,437/female 9,071,163)
25–54 years: 37.85% (male 20,032,310/female 19,376,847)
55–64 years: 6.08% (male 3,160,438/female 3,172,544)
65 years and over: 4.44% (2020 est.) (male 2,213,539/female 2,411,457)

Median age
total: 24.1 years. Country comparison to the world: 166th
male: 23.8 years
female: 24.5 years (2020 est.)

Population growth rate
1.68% (2022 est.) Country comparison to the world: 56th

Birth rate
21.46 births/1,000 population (2022 est.) Country comparison to the world: 63rd

Death rate
4.32 deaths/1,000 population (2022 est.) Country comparison to the world: 208th

Total fertility rate
2.88 children born/woman (2022 est.) Country comparison to the world: 52nd

Net migration rate
-0.31 migrant(s)/1,000 population (2022 est.) Country comparison to the world: 120th

Mother's mean age at first birth
22.6 years (2014 est.)
note: median age at first birth among women 25–49

Life expectancy at birth
total population: 74.45 years. Country comparison to the world: 136th
male: 73.26 years
female: 75.72 years (2022 est.)

 total population: 72.7 years
 male: 71.4 years
 female: 74.2 years (2016 est.)

Contraceptive prevalence rate
58.5% (2014)

Urbanization
urban population: 43% of total population (2022)
rate of urbanization: 1.9% annual rate of change (2020–25 est.)

Nationality
 noun: Egyptian(s)
 adjective: Egyptian

Literacy
definition: age 15 and over can read and write

total population: 71.2%
male: 76.5%
female: 65.5% (2017)

 total population: 73.85%
 male: 82.1% (2015 est.)
 female: 65.6% (2015 est.)

School life expectancy (primary to tertiary education)
total: 14 years
male: 14 years
female: 14 years (2018)

Major infectious diseases
degree of risk: intermediate (2020)
food or waterborne diseases: bacterial diarrhea, hepatitis A, and typhoid fever
water contact diseases: schistosomiasis

Genetics

Y-Chromosome
Listed here are the human Y-chromosome DNA haplogroups in Egypt.

See also
 Health in Egypt
 List of cities in Egypt
 Population history of Egypt

Notes

References

External links 

 
 
 Demographics of ancient Egypt